Abundisporus mollissimus is a species of bracket fungus in the family Polyporaceae. This white rot fungus was described as new to science in 2015 by mycologists Bao-Kai Cui and Chang-Lin Zhao. The type was found fruiting on a fallen angiosperm trunk in Chengmai County (Hainan Province, China); it has also been found on a dead tree of Xanthophyllum hainanense. A. mollissimus is distinguished from other Abundisporus species by its effused-reflexed to pileate and soft fruit bodies, narrower skeletal hyphae, and spores that measure 4–4.5 by 3–3.5 μm.

References

Polyporaceae
Fungi described in 2015
Fungi of China
Taxa named by Bao-Kai Cui